Aygün Yıldırım (born 4 April 1995) is a German professional footballer who plays as a forward for SSV Jahn Regensburg.

Career
In May 2021 2. Bundesliga club SSV Jahn Regensburg announced the signing of Yıldırım for the 2021–22 season. He joined from 3. Liga side SC Verl and signed a contract until 2023.

References

External links
 
 

1995 births
Living people
People from Ahlen
Sportspeople from Münster (region)
Footballers from North Rhine-Westphalia
German footballers
Turkish footballers
German people of Turkish descent
Association football forwards
Rot Weiss Ahlen players
SC Wiedenbrück 2000 players
Sportfreunde Lotte players
SC Verl players
SSV Jahn Regensburg players
2. Bundesliga players
3. Liga players
Regionalliga players